Mark Reber (born 14 January 1969) is a former professional rugby league footballer who played for North Sydney in the ARL and NRL,  and Wigan in the Super League.

Playing career
He then switched to rugby league and made his first grade debut for North Sydney in round 20 of the 1995 ARL season against Western Suburbs at North Sydney Oval.  In the same year, he played in North Sydney's elimination final loss against the Newcastle Knights at Parramatta Stadium.

In the 1996 ARL season, Reber only made one appearance for the first grade team which came against the Western Reds in round 11 at North Sydney Oval. 

Reber started at Hooker in the 1997 preliminary final between the North Sydney Bears and the Newcastle Knights.  Newcastle won the match 17–12. 

The next season, Reber made 25 appearances for Norths and was in the sides that lost both finals matches in succession.  In 1999, Reber joined Wigan where he made 18 appearances over 2 seasons.

References

External links
 Profile at wigan.rlfans.com

1969 births
Living people
North Sydney Bears players
Wigan Warriors players
Rugby league hookers
Australian rugby league players
Place of birth missing (living people)